The Samuel Parker House is a historic house in Reading, Massachusetts, United States. The front, gambrel-roofed portion of this house, was probably built in the mid-1790s, and the house as a whole reflects a vernacular Georgian-Federal style.  The house is noted for a succession of working-class owners (of which Samuel Parker, a cooper, was one).  Its most notable resident was Carrie Belle Kenney, one of the earliest female graduates of the Massachusetts Institute of Technology.

The house was listed on the National Register of Historic Places in 1984.

See also
National Register of Historic Places listings in Reading, Massachusetts
National Register of Historic Places listings in Middlesex County, Massachusetts

References

Houses on the National Register of Historic Places in Reading, Massachusetts
Houses in Reading, Massachusetts
1795 establishments in Massachusetts